Early Works for Me If It Works for You is an album by Dntel (Jimmy Tamborello), released in 1998 on the Phthalo Records label.  It failed to chart in the United States.

Track listing
 "Loneliness Is Having No One to Miss"
 "High Horses Theme"
 "Pliesex Sielking"
 "Termites in the Bathtub"
 "Fort Instructions"
 "Curtains"
 "Tybalt 60"
 "Danny Loves Experimental Electronics"
 "Sky Pointing"
 "Casuals"
 "Winds Let Me Down Again"
 "Jewel States, 'The Door Borders'"

External links
 Album at Discogs

1998 debut albums
Dntel albums